Pseudochromis flammicauda the orangetail dottyback orfire-tail dottyback, is a species of ray-finned fish from Australia which is a member of the family Pseudochromidae. It occasionally makes its way into the aquarium trade. This fish grows to a size of 5.5 cm in length.

See also 
 List of marine aquarium fish species

References

flammicauda
Fish described in 1976